The Ecuador Open Quito was a men's tennis event on the ATP Tour held in the Ecuadorean capital of Quito. Begun in 2015, it was part of the ATP 250 Series. The tournament was played on outdoor clay courts. The event replaced the Chile Open.

The city was previously home to the Quito Open, a Grand Prix-affiliated tournament played from 1979 to 1982.

Quito is located at 2800 metres above sea level, more than twice as high than the Alps tournaments. Players must adapt to thinner air, which causes breathing difficulties and makes the ball faster.

Victor Estrella Burgos won the title in 2015, successfully defended it in 2016 and did so again in 2017. However, he lost in the second round of the 2018 edition to Gerald Melzer.

On 24 August 2018, tournament organisers announced that the tournament had folded due to lack of financial support.

Results

Singles

Doubles

See also
 Quito Open – men's Grand Prix tournament held from 1979 to 1982

References

External links
 Official site
 ATP results archive

 
Clay court tennis tournaments
Tennis tournaments in Ecuador
Recurring sporting events established in 2015
Recurring sporting events disestablished in 2018